Brian Hanly Asselstine (born September 23, 1953) is a former professional baseball player. He played all or part of six seasons in Major League Baseball, from 1976 until 1981, for the Atlanta Braves, primarily as an outfielder. Asselstine was born in Santa Barbara, California and attended Santa Ynez Valley Union High School then Allan Hancock College. He was drafted by the Atlanta Braves in the 1st round (15th pick) of the 1973 Major League Baseball Draft

Asselstine won the job as the Braves starting center fielder early in the 1978. On May 31, 1978, Asselstine broke the bone just above the ankle in one of his legs as a result of his leaping for a home run hit by Mike Lum. He was out for the rest of the season.

References

External links

 Baseball Almanac

Major League Baseball outfielders
Allan Hancock Bulldogs baseball players
Atlanta Braves players
Greenwood Braves players
Savannah Braves players
Richmond Braves players
Phoenix Giants players
Baseball players from California
1953 births
Living people
Sportspeople from Santa Barbara, California